Kim Hyuk-kyu, better known as Deft, is a South Korean professional League of Legends player for Dplus KIA. In 2018, he was selected as one of the torch relay runners for the 2018 PyeongChang Winter Olympics, alongside his fellow kt Rolster teammates. As a member of DRX, he won the 2022 League of Legends World Championship.

Early life 
Deft was born on October 23, 1996, in Seoul, South Korea. He graduated from Sangam Middle School and dropped out of Mapo High School, the same high school with Faker from T1.

He used to play Sudden Attack before going professional. He is a fan of Tottenham Hotspur F.C. and a fan of Son Heung-min. He used to play League of Legends on the North American server before going professional in the year 2011.

His favourite champion is Jinx.

Career

Season 3 
On February 18, 2013, Deft joined MVP Blue. The team placed 9–12th place in Champions 2013 Spring and 9–16th place in Champions 2014 Summer.

Season 4 
On September 6, 2013, Deft joined Samsung Blue. The team achieved much success in Champions placing respectively, with a standing of 5–8th, 1st and 2nd place in Winter, Spring and Summer Splits. The team qualified for Season 4 World Championship, going into the tournament as favorites. The team ultimately fell at the hands of their sister team, and eventual World Champions, Samsung White in semi-finals. Deft left the team after the Season 4 World Championship.

Season 5 
On November 11, 2014, Deft joined EDward Gaming with his former Samsung teammate and World Champion, PawN.

The duo achieved much success in LPL 2015, placing 1st in both Regular Season Splits, qualifying for Season 5 World Championship and winning Spring Split Playoffs, China Regional Qualifier and the first edition of Mid Season Invitational - an international event, where the winners of all major regions are invited to compete between Spring and Summer Splits.

EDward Gaming ultimately fell in their quest of bringing the World Championship to China for the first time in a losing effort against the European Champions, Fnatic in quarter-finals.

Season 6 
Deft stayed in EDward Gaming for another year, where the team achieved 2nd and 1st place respectively in Spring and Summer splits, as well as regular season splits.

Deft is the seventh player to reach 1,000 kills in the LPL on August 26, 2016.

The team faced RNG in both finals, in which they lost Spring with 1–3 and won Summer with 3–0.

Deft and EDward Gaming qualified for 2016 World Championship, where they lost 1–3 in quarter-finals against ROX Tigers. Deft went back to Korea after the tournament.

Season 7 
On November 30, 2016, Deft joined KT Rolster, along with other players such as former ROX Tigers top laner Smeb, former EDward Gaming mid laner Pawn, and former RNG support Mata, creating a "Super Team Rivalry" against SK Telecom T1.

The teams met in the LCK Spring Split Finals, where KT Rolster fell with 0–3, and LCK Summer Split Semi-Finals, where KT Rolster failed to win again, this time 2–3.

The lost in Summer split pushed the team out of qualifying for the Season 7 World Championship with tournament points, in which KT Rolster had to win the Korea Regional Qualifier in order to make it.

In Regional Finals, KT lost to eventual World Champions, Samsung Galaxy with a score of 0–3.

Season 8 
Deft and the rest of KT Rolster decided to remain in the team even after a disappointing season. The team placed 3rd in Spring Split Playoffs and 1st in Summer Split Playoffs, where they defeated the rookie sensation team, Griffin, with 3–2, making it Deft's second LCK title.

Deft received the most MVP games in the whole league, but did not win the Spring Split MVP award.

KT Rolster qualified for 2018 League of Legends World Championship, where they lost in an extremely close series to eventual World Champions, Invictus Gaming, with 2–3.

Season 9 
On November 25, 2018, Deft joined Kingzone DragonX. The team achieved 3rd place in the Spring Split Playoffs.

He is the ninth player to reach 1,000 kills in the LCK. He achieved his 1,000 kills on March 21, 2019. His 1,000th kill was on kt Rolster Kingen's Aatrox with his Ezreal. He is the first and only player to have reached 1,000 kills in two different regions.

The team collapsed in Summer Split, resulting them to place at 7th in regular season. It was the first time in Deft's career where he missed playoffs.

However, high placing in Spring Split allowed Kingzone DragonX to get a second chance at qualifying for World Championship, but the team ultimately fell in Regional Finals to DAMWON Gaming in a close, 2–3 effort.

Season 10 
On October 10, 2019, Kingzone DragonX rebranded as DragonX, and decided to rebuild the team around Deft. The team was completed with rookies such as Pyosik and Keria from DragonX academy, and the Griffin duo Doran and Chovy.

DragonX placed 3rd and 2nd respectively in the LCK Spring and Summer Splits, which qualified them for Mid Season Cup 2020 and Season 10 World Championship.

At Mid Season Cup, DRX placed tied for 2nd in the group with a 2–1 record, but lost both tie-breaker games.

The team lost the LCK Summer Season Finals against Damwon Gaming with a match score of 0–3.

At World Championship, DRX lost again in the quarter-finals to the eventual World Champions Damwon Gaming with a match score of 0–3.

Season 11 
On November 23, 2020, Deft joined Hanwha Life Esports.

The team struggled for most of the Spring Split, but managed to get 3rd place in LCK Spring Split Playoffs.

On February 4, 2021, Deft won his 300th game in the LCK. His 300th win was against Afreeca Freecs.

On March 14, 2021, Deft became the third player to have played 500 games in the LCK. He won his 500th game against Liiv SANDBOX.

In Summer, the struggles piled up even more and the team placed 8th in LCK Summer Split, the lowest place Deft achieved since 2013.

However, a high standings placement in Spring Split let HLE get a second chance at qualifying for the 2021 World Championship, where the team went on a "miracle run" winning 2 series in a row from the lowest placement in the bracket in the Regional Finals. They first defeated Liiv SANDBOX with a set score of 3–1, then swept Nongshim Redforce with a set score of 3–0, allowed them to grab the final seat for World Championship. In the match against T1 to determine the 4th seed, they lost with a set score of 2–3, and was placed second in the Regional Finals.

Second place allowed Deft and his team to qualify for the World Championship, this time as the lowest LCK seed having to start the competition from The Play-In Tournament. HLE placed 2nd in Play-Ins and managed to make it to the quarter-finals, where they eventually met T1 again, in a losing effort 0–3.

On December 4, 2021, DRX announced that Deft would be joining them for the upcoming season.

Season 12 
Deft and his team struggled with 3 consecutive losses at the beginning of the split. They gained their first win of the split in the match against Kwangdong Freecs.

In February 2022, Deft has reached 3,000 career kills milestone, he is the first and so far only player to reach that amount. Deft is the current all time-kills leader in League of Legends Esports, with Uzi and Faker behind him. He also played his career 1,000th game in the same month, and was the first player to achieve the milestone.

On February 24, 2022, Deft became the second player and the first AD Carry to reach 2,000 kills in the LCK.

He played his 600th LCK games on March 24, 2022.

His team was placed 5th in LCK Spring 2022, after losing to Kwangdong Freecs with a score of 2–3.

Deft and his team was placed 6th in LCK Summer 2022, after losing to Liiv Sandbox with a score of 1–3. On September 4, 2022, Deft and his team successfully secured the last LCK spot to the World Championship after defeating Liiv Sandbox with a match score of 3–2. After going undefeated in play-ins and finishing first in the group stage, DRX reverse swept Edward Gaming, becoming the second team ever to reverse sweep someone at Worlds. This became Deft's second time in the semi-finals, with his previous time being 8 years ago during the Season 4 World Championship.

On November 5, 2022, DRX won the Season 12 World Championship, winning against T1 3–2. Deft is the oldest professional player to win the League of Legends World Championship.

Accomplishments

Individual awards 
 LPL of the Year Awards 2016 – Most Valuable Player
 LPL of the Year Awards 2016 – Best AD Carry
 LCK Spring Split 2020 All-Pro 3rd Team
 LCK Summer Split 2020 All-Pro 3rd Team
 LCK Spring Split 2022 All-Pro 3rd Team
 LCK Awards 2022 - meme of the year

References

Notes

External links 
 

Living people
1996 births
South Korean esports players
Sportspeople from Seoul
League of Legends AD Carry players
KT Rolster players
Edward Gaming players
DRX (esports) players
Twitch (service) streamers